Abernethy may refer to:

Places

Scotland
 Abernethy, Perth and Kinross, a village
 Abernethy (NBR) railway station, a former railway station in this village
 Nethy Bridge, Highland, a village formerly known as Abernethy
 Abernethy Forest, a forest and national nature reserve
 Presbytery of Abernethy, part of the Church of Scotland

Elsewhere
 Abernethy, New South Wales, Australia, a town
 Rural Municipality of Abernethy No. 186, Saskatchewan, Canada
 Abernethy, Saskatchewan, a village
 Abernethy Flats, a gravel plain in Antarctica

Other uses
 Abernethy (surname)
 Lord of Abernethy, a Scottish title of nobility
 Abernethy (charity)
 Abernethy Road, in Hazelmere, Perth, Western Australia
 Abernethy Bridge, Oregon, United States spanning the Willamette River
 Abernethy biscuit, developed by London surgeon John Abernethy
 Abernethy v Mott, Hay and Anderson, a 1974 UK labour law case

See also
 Meg of Abernethy (1355–1405), Scottish harper at the royal court, earliest known Scottish female harper
 Abernathy (disambiguation)